WKXR (1260 AM) is a radio station broadcasting a classic country music format. Licensed to Asheboro, North Carolina, United States, the station is owned by South Triad Broadcasting Corp. and features programming from AP Radio and Jones Radio Network. The station was established in 1947 as WGWR, and is simulcast on translator station W235CO (94.9 FM).

History
The station signed on May 24, 1947 as WGWR. It changed its call letters to WKXR on April 4, 1984. When Chris Kelly of WKRR worked at WKXR as a teenager, the station's playlist included Patsy Cline, Hank Williams Jr. and Tammy Wynette.

WKXR started its broadcast day at 5:00 a.m. and ended its broadcast day at 11:00 p.m.  However, in recent years, WKXR has continued to broadcast from 11:00 p.m. to 5:00 a.m.  WKXR turns its power down at 11:00 pm, but its feed still plays on Time Warner Cable of Asheboro's channel 8, a local Public-access television cable TV channel mainly used for local bulletins.

Programming
WKXR also broadcasts live sporting events such as NASCAR racing, college football, college basketball, NFL football, and local high school sports (for Asheboro High School and Southwestern Randolph High School), in addition to American Legion Post 45 baseball, Asheboro Copperheads baseball and news from the North Carolina News Network. One of WKXR's most enduring features is the Swap Shop, a call-in show used to sell used items. WKXR plays a mix of classic country and modern country. On Sundays, WKXR carries Sunday morning worship services from local churches.

Translator

References

External links

KXR
Classic country radio stations in the United States
Radio stations established in 1947
1947 establishments in North Carolina